The 2002–03 Croatian Ice Hockey League season was the 12th season of the Croatian Ice Hockey League, the top level of ice hockey in Croatia. Four teams participated in the league, and KHL Medveščak Zagreb won the championship.

Regular season

Playoffs

Semifinals
 KHL Medveščak Zagreb – INA Sisak 2:0 (25:1, 7:1)
 KHL Zagreb – KHL Mladost Zagreb 2:0 (1:0, 1:0)

3rd place 
 KHL Mladost Zagreb – INA Sisak 3:0 (1:0, 5:0 Forfeit, 9:1)

Final 
 KHL Medveščak Zagreb – KHL Zagreb 3:2 (5:2, 3:4 n.V., 3:5, 3:2 n.P., 6:2)

External links 
 Season on hockeyarchives.info

Croatian Ice Hockey League
1
Croatian Ice Hockey League seasons